Maodo Lô (born 31 December 1992) is a German-Senegalese professional basketball player for Alba Berlin of the German Basketball Bundesliga (BBL) and the EuroLeague. He previously played for Columbia University in New York City.  Nicknamed The Chairman by fans at Columbia, Lô is known as one of the biggest talents in German basketball. He is the son of a Senegalese father and internationally acclaimed German painter Elvira Bach.

College career

He played  college basketball for Columbia University of the Ivy League. He averaged 14.5 points per game during his four-year career. In 2016 he led Columbia to the CIT championship and was named MVP of the Tournament.

Professional career
After going undrafted in the 2016 NBA draft, Lô joined the Philadelphia 76ers summer league team. He played for the Sixers team in the Las Vegas Summer League.

Brose Bamberg (2016–2018)

2016–17 season
On 22 July 2016, Lô signed a contract with the German team Brose Bamberg. In his first season with Bamberg, Lô won the double, as he won the Basketball Bundesliga and the BBL-Pokal. In the EuroLeague, Lô averaged 5.3 points and 1.2 assists in 10.5 minutes per game.

2017–18 season
In his second season with Brose, the team finished 4th in the regular season. In the semi-finals, Bamberg was eliminated by Bayern Munich.

Bayern Munich (2018–2020)
On July 13, 2018, Lô signed a two-year deal with the German team FC Bayern Munich.

Alba Berlin (2020–present)
On July 22, 2020, he has signed with Alba Berlin of the Basketball Bundesliga. Lô averaged 9.5 points and 3.1 assists per game. He signed a two-year extension with the team on August 4, 2021.

International career
In 2014, Lô was first selected for the German national basketball team. He was selected for the squad that participated at EuroBasket 2015 where he averaged 4.6 points, 1.2 rebounds and 1.4 assists per game.

Career statistics

EuroLeague

|-
| style="text-align:left;"| 2016–17
| style="text-align:left;"| Brose Bamberg
| 26 || 2 || 10.5 || .500 || .420 || .667 || 1.2 || 1.2 || .3 || .1 || 5.3 || 4.0
|-
| style="text-align:left;"|2017–18
| style="text-align:left;"| Brose Bamberg
| 30 || 5 || 16.4 || .473 || .414 || .786 || 1.4 || 1.8 || .3 || .1 || 6.9 || 4.1
|- class="sortbottom"
| colspan=2 style="text-align:center;"| Career
| 56 || 7 ||  || .484 || .416 || .731 || 1.3 || 1.6 || .3 || .1 || 6.2 ||

References

External links
Columbia bio

1992 births
Living people
2019 FIBA Basketball World Cup players
Alba Berlin players
Basketball players at the 2020 Summer Olympics
Basketball players from Berlin
Brose Bamberg players
Columbia College (New York) alumni
Columbia Lions men's basketball players
FC Bayern Munich basketball players
German expatriate basketball people in the United States
German men's basketball players
German people of Senegalese descent
German sportspeople of African descent
Medalists at the 2015 Summer Universiade
Olympic basketball players of Germany
Point guards
Universiade medalists in basketball
Universiade silver medalists for Germany